King George was a British merchant ship engaged in whaling and the maritime fur trade in the late 18th century. She was launched in 1785 and taken up by the King George's Sound Company. The two vessels whaled in the South Seas and sought furs in the Pacific Northwest. They returned to England via Guangzhou (Canton), where they picked up cargoes for the British East India Company (EIC). Their voyage accomplished a circumnavigation of the world. On her return new owners apparently sailed her between Britain and South Carolina. She is no longer listed after 1796.

Voyage (1785-88)
In 1785 Richard Cadman Etches and partners, including Nathaniel Portlock and George Dixon, formed a partnership, commonly called the King George's Sound Company, to develop the fur trade. Portlock and Dixon had served in the Pacific on James Cook's third voyage. In September 1785 Portlock, in King George, and Dixon, in the smaller Queen Charlotte, sailed from England. They sailed together for most of their three-year voyage. They crossed the Atlantic Ocean, reaching Port Egmont, in the Falkland Islands, on 5 January 1786. They then transited Cape Horn to enter the Pacific Ocean. They reached the Hawaiian islands on 24 May and anchored in Kealakekua Bay (where Cook had been killed in 1779), but did not go ashore. They took on fresh food at other Hawaiian islands and proceeded on to what is now Alaska.

After two years of plying the waters, Portlock and Dixon departed North America, reaching Macao in November 1787.

In China Portlock picked up a cargo for the British East India Company. Homeward bound, Portlock sailed from China 10 February 1788 and on 13 March reached North Island, the northmost of three islands in the bay that formed the principle anchorage of Enggano Island. King George reached St Helena on 13 June, and arrived at The Downs on 23 August.

On their return Portlock and Dixon each published accounts of their voyage.

Fate
No longer listed after 1796.

See also
List of historical ships in British Columbia

Notes

Citations

References
 
 
 

Pre-Confederation British Columbia
Sailing ships of the United Kingdom
1785 ships
Whaling ships
Ships of the British East India Company